Filipe Matzembacher (born June 20, 1988) is a Brazilian film director and writer.

Filmography

As director

As actor

References

External links
 

1988 births
Living people
People from Porto Alegre
Brazilian people of German descent
Brazilian film directors
Brazilian screenwriters